Petrobras 36 (P-36) was at the time the largest floating semi-submersible oil platform in the world prior to its sinking on 20 March 2001. It was owned by Petrobras, a semi-public Brazilian oil company headquartered in Rio de Janeiro. The cost of the platform was US$350 million (currently US$).

The vessel was built at the Fincantieri shipyard in Genoa, Italy in 1995 as a drilling rig. She was owned then by Società Armamento Navi Appoggio S.p.A.  The  rig was converted by Davie Industry, Lévis, Canada to the world's largest oil production platform.

P-36 was replaced by FPSO-Brasil which is a leased vessel from SBM Offshore. The FPSO-Brasil started its lease contract with Petrobras in December 2002. In 2007, the P-52 platform (FPSO P-52) built in Singapore and Brazil came into operation.

Accident
In the early hours of March 15, 2001 there were two explosions in the aft starboard column at or around the emergency drain tank. The first explosion was caused by an overpressure event, the second by ignition of leaking hydrocarbon vapor. At the time there were 175 people on the rig; 11 were killed. Following the explosions, the rig developed a 16° list, sufficient to allow down-flooding from the submerged fairlead boxes.

Marine salvage teams tried over the weekend to save the platform by pumping nitrogen and compressed air into the tanks to expel the water, but they abandoned the rig after bad weather.

See also 

 Industrial disasters

References

External links 
 BBC article
 NASA Safety Center Report
 Sinking of the Petrobras P-36 Photographs of the platform's sinking.
 SustainAbility case study Costs of the sinking.
 Petrobras Oil Rig Project with images on the P-36
 Article in Offshore Sinking Sequence of P36

Collapsed oil platforms
2001 disasters in Brazil
2001 industrial disasters
Disasters in Brazil
Oil platform disasters
Petrobras
Semi-submersibles
Drilling rigs
Ships built by Fincantieri
Maritime incidents in 2001
Maritime incidents in Brazil
1995 ships